Trionyx ikoviensis is an extinct species of softshell turtles which existed in what is now Ukraine during the early Lutetian age of the Eocene epoch.

References

Extinct animals of Europe
I
Eocene turtles
Extinct turtles